Chinateatern or commonly known as "China" (in English: The China Theatre) is a private theatre in Stockholm, Sweden, located at Berzelii Park in Stockholm city. Originally built 1928 as a movie theatre but has over the years simultaneously been used as a theatre stage for revues, comedies and musical shows. It was very popular in the 1980s and the stage has during various periods been used by different established Swedish theatres, one being Dramaten.

Chinateatern is situated next to the Stockholm restaurant Berns Salonger.

External links
 Chinateatern.se (official site)

Theatres in Stockholm